Nadi Riadi Baladiate Teleghma, known as NRB Teleghma  or simply NRBT/B for short, is an Algerian football club based in Hai Ouled Smail in Teleghma. The club was founded in 1992 and its colours are blue and white. Their home stadium, Bachir Khabaza Stadium, has a capacity of 5,000 spectators. The club is currently playing in the Algerian Ligue 2. 

On March 30, 2019,  NRB Teleghma/B promoted to the Ligue Nationale du Football Amateur after winning 2018–19 Inter-Régions Division "Group Centre East".

On August 5, 2020, NRB Teleghma promoted to the Algerian Ligue 2.

Players

Current squad
As of 5 February 2022.

Personnel

Current technical staff

References

External links 

Football clubs in Algeria